Makarovka is a rural locality (a selo) in Novotselinny Selsoviet, Klyuchevsky District, Altai Krai, Russia. The population was 26 as of 2013. There are 6 streets.

Geography 
Makarovka is located 24 km east of Klyuchi (the district's administrative centre) by road. Petukhi is the nearest rural locality.

References 

Rural localities in Klyuchevsky District